YK (or yk) may refer to:

Places
 Yellowknife, Northwest Territories, the capital of the Northwest Territories of Canada
 Yogyakarta, a city in Indonesia
Yogyakarta railway station, a railway station in Yogyakarta (station code YK)
 Yukon, a territory in Canada (with any casing, within internet TLD .CA, and as YK for an unofficial postal abbreviation)

In business
 IATA airline codes:
 YK, former code for Cyprus Turkish Airlines (defunct since June 2010)
 Avia Traffic Company of Kyrgyzstan (starting between June 2010 and end of 2015) 
 Yugen kaisha, a form of business organization in Japan

Other uses
 Yom Kippur, a Jewish Day of Atonement
 Yottakelvin, a measure of temperature equal to 1 septillion kelvin, or 1000000000000000000000000°K